Oberland (German for Highlands) was the name of a canton of the Helvetic Republic (1798–1803), corresponding to the area of the Bernese Oberland, with its capital at Thun.

History
After the Napoleonic invasion of Switzerland in 1798, the old Bernese order was broken up and the Oberland separated from the rest of the canton.  Within the new canton, historic borders and traditional rights were not considered.  As there had been no previous separatist feeling amongst the conservative population, there was little enthusiasm for the new order.

The 1801 Malmaison Constitution proposed reuniting the Oberland with Bern, but it was not until the Act of Mediation, two years later, with the abolition of the Helvetic Republic and the partial restoration of the ancien régime, that the two cantons were reunited.

Districts
During its short-lived existence, the canton was administered in ten districts, each named for the district seat, except where shown:

  Aeschi
  Brienz
  Frutigen
  Interlaken (district seat: Wilderswil)
  Oberhasli (Meiringen)
  Saanen
  Upper Simmental (Zweisimmen)
  Lower Simmental (Erlenbach)
  Thun
  Unterseen

Notes and references

External links 
 

Cantons of the Helvetic Republic
Former cantons of Switzerland